Grabowo Królewskie  is a village in the administrative district of Gmina Kołaczkowo, within Września County, Greater Poland Voivodeship, in west-central Poland.

Mansion in Grabowo Krolewskie

Mansion in Grabowo Królewskie is the ruins of a building from the interwar period, located in Grabowo Królewskie, part of Greater Poland Voivodeship. The mansion in Grabowo Krolewskie was built in 1928. It was entered into the registry of monuments in 1998. The mansion belonged to the owner of the village, Witold Wilkoszewski (November 22, 1881 - April 17, 1937). After World War II, it housed a lounge and a library. The manor house was surrounded by a garden. In his area, he placed concrete and plaster figurines of saints, farmers, and cupids. In 1928, the park was surrounded by a fence with gates.

Gallery

See also
 Church of the Sacred Heart of Jesus, Grabowo Królewskie

References

Villages in Września County